Tanzania pusillus is a species of jumping spider in the genus Tanzania that lives in Tanzania. The male was first described in 2000 and the species was originally known as Lilliput pusillus.

References

Endemic fauna of Tanzania
Fauna of Tanzania
Salticidae
Spiders described in 2000
Spiders of Africa